Luis Antonio Díez (2 November 1923 – 23 September 2015) was an Argentine water polo player who competed in the 1952 Summer Olympics.

References

1923 births
2015 deaths
Argentine male water polo players
Olympic water polo players of Argentina
Water polo players at the 1952 Summer Olympics